Tristria is a genus of grasshoppers in the subfamily Tropidopolinae with species found in Africa and tropical Asia.

Species
The Orthoptera Species File lists:
Tristria angolensis Bolívar, 1890
Tristria brachyptera Bolívar, 1912
Tristria conica Uvarov, 1953
Tristria conops Karsch, 1896
Tristria discoidalis Bolívar, 1890
Tristria guangxiensis Li, Lu, Jiang & Meng, 1991
Tristria marginicosta Karsch, 1896
Tristria pallida Karny, 1907
Tristria pisciforme Serville, 1838 - type species (as synonym T. lacerta Stål)
Tristria pulvinata Uvarov, 1921

References

External links
 Image at iNaturalist
 
 

Acrididae genera
Orthoptera of Asia
Orthoptera of Africa